Zacatecas is a state of Mexico.

Zacatecas may also refer to:

Places
 Zacatecas City, capital city of Zacatecas
 Zacatecas Cathedral
 Zacatecas, Acaponeta
 Zacatecas, Jalostotitlán
 Zacatecas, La Paz
 Zacatecas, Mezquital
 Zacatecas, Sabinas Hidalgo
 Zacatecas, San Miguel de Allende

Other
 Mineros de Zacatecas, Mexican football team
 "Zacatecas March", Zacatecas patriotic song
 Zacatecas ankasokellus, a species of moth in the monotypic genus Zacatecas